Nicrophorus defodiens is a burying beetle described by Mannerheim in 1846.

In 2012, N. defodiens was found to be one of at least two burying beetles which can breed in the forest canopy.

Ecology
When it comes to mating, the males of N. defodiens use  a pheromonal signal to attract their mate. During the mating period females often bite males. When copulation is over, the males' pheromone emission is resumed, but the female attempts to obstruct the male from attracting any additional females, thus imposing monogamy on the male.
Unlike N. orbicollis this species produces twice as many eggs (roughly 23.9 in total).

References

Silphidae
Beetles of North America
Beetles described in 1846
Taxa named by Carl Gustaf Mannerheim (naturalist)